Takaoka Dam is a dam in Miyazaki Prefecture, Japan, completed in 1932.

References 

Dams in Miyazaki Prefecture
Dams completed in 1932